Sebastian Schubert (born 17 July 1988 in Hamm) is a German slalom canoeist who has competed at the international level since 2004.

He won a gold medal in the K1 team event at the 2011 ICF Canoe Slalom World Championships in Bratislava. He also won eight medals at the European Championships (2 golds, 4 silvers and 2 bronzes). Schubert won the overall world cup title in the K1 category in 2013 and 2014. He finished the 2014 season as the World No. 1.

World Cup individual podiums

References

External links

German male canoeists
Living people
1988 births
Medalists at the ICF Canoe Slalom World Championships
Sportspeople from Hamm